Lourie is a name from Scotland, Northern England and Ireland.  It often appears as Laurie and Lowry.     Notable people with the surname include:

 Arthur Lourié (1892-1966), Russian composer
 Don Lourie (1899-1990), American football player
  Eugene Lourié (1903-1991), Parisian Art Director born in the Ukraine
  Evgeniya Lourié (Евгения Лурье) - married Boris Pasternak in 1922.
 Joel Lourie (born 1962), Democratic member of the South Carolina Senate
 John Lourie Beveridge (1824–1910), governor of Illinois
 Serge Lourie (born 1946), English councillor and Leader of Richmond upon Thames Council
 Peter Lourie (born 1952), Michigan writer

See also
 Lourie-Love Field, now Roberts Stadium (soccer stadium) at Princeton University, United States
 Grey lourie, a southern African bird
 Knysna lourie, an African bird

References

Patronymic surnames
Jewish surnames